Tuesday's Child is Canadian singer-songwriter Amanda Marshall's second album, released in 1999. The album was certified triple platinum by the CRIA selling over 300,000 copies across Canada. The singles off her second album include, "Believe In You", "Love Lift Me", "If I Didn't Have You", "Shades of Grey", and "Why Don't You Love Me". This album produced two top 10 hits in Canada.

Promotion
The only time she was promoting "Tuesday's Child", she was in Phoenix, Arizona signing copies of her album, and doing a meet-and-greet. She also performed "Why Don't You Love Me" during this session.

Track listing
"Believe In You" (Amanda Marshall, Eric Bazilian) 4.31
"Love Lift Me" (Marshall, Bazilian, Randy Cantor, John Bettis) 3.47
"Why Don't You Love Me?" (Marshall, Bazilian, Desmond Child) 4.12
"Too Little, Too Late" (Marshall, Bazilian) 4.36
"If I Didn't Have You" (Marshall, Bazilian) 5.33
"Ride" (Marshall, Bazilian, Child) 4.27
"Right Here All Along" (Marshall, Carole King) 5.14
"Wishful Thinking" (Maia Sharp, Cantor) 4.40
"Shades of Grey" (Marshall, Bazilian) 5.03
"Give Up Giving In" (Marshall, Bazilian) 4.47
"Best of Me" (Marshall, Bazilian) 4.26
"Never Said Goodbye" (Marshall, Bazilian) 6.24
"Out of Bounds" (Marshall, Marti Frederiksen) 3.53
"Just Love Me" (Japan bonus track)

Personnel
Amanda Marshall – vocals, piano, electric piano, Wurlitzer piano, Fender Rhodes, keyboards, percussion
Eric Bazilian – guitar, bass guitar, mandolin, piano, keyboards, omnichord, background vocals
Andy Kravitz – drums, percussion, omnichord
Gota Yashiki – drum loops
Jamie Muhoberac – acoustic piano, keyboards
Richie Sambora – electric guitar
Mark Goldenberg – electric guitar
Dean Parks – acoustic guitar, mandolin
Rob Misener – bass guitar
Steve Jordan – drums
Benmont Tench – Hammond B3 organ
Paulinho Da Costa – percussion
Carole King – keyboards, background vocals
Paul Jackson Jr. – electric guitar
Matt Rollings – piano
John O'Brien – programming
Kenny Aronoff – drums
Waddy Wachtel – electric & acoustic guitar
Joe Sublett – horns
Darrell Leonard – horns
Roger Manning – background vocals
Mark Isham – trumpet
David Campbell – arranger

Charts

Weekly charts

Year-end charts

Certifications

References

 

1999 albums
Amanda Marshall albums
Albums arranged by David Campbell (composer)
Albums produced by Don Was
Sony Music Canada albums